The common pug (Eupithecia vulgata) is a moth of the family Geometridae. It is a common species across the Palearctic region, including the Near East and North Africa. It ranges from the Atlantic coast of Ireland and Portugal across Europe, the Middle East and Central Asia to the Russian Far East (Priamurje) and Korea.

Description
The wingspan is 18–21 mm. The ground colour of the forewings variously is very variable – brown to fuscous, with a reddish tinge, ochreous, or whitish. The darker fuscous striae are angulated and the postmedian line is biangulate. The posterior edge of the median band is marked with black, the subterminal line is interrupted into whitish dots and a small white tornal mark. The forewings have either a minute dark discal mark or are without a discal mark. Forewings with a  crescentic pale tornal stain. The hindwings are similarly to the forewings but less conspicuously patterned. See also Prout.  The larva is naked, long and slender, greyish green or light brown, on its back with a variety of rhomboid, darker spots. The reddish brown pupa has olive green wing sheaths. At the pointed cremaster there are eight hook bristles.

 

Two broods are produced each year with adults on the wing in May and June and again in August. The species flies at night and is attracted to light. It colonizes a variety of different habitats, such as forest edges, bushes, hedges, embankments and plant corridors as well as gardens and parks. The occurrence in the Alps reaches up to 1500 meters. 

The larvae feed on a variety of plants (see list below). The species overwinters as a pupa.

Larval food plants
Achillea – yarrow
Artemisia
Campanula – harebell
Centaurea
Crataegus – hawthorn
Galium – bedstraw
Salix – willow
Senecio – ragwort
Solidago – goldenrod
Vaccinium – bilberry

Subspecies
Eupithecia vulgata vulgata
Eupithecia vulgata clarensis Huggins, 1962 Ireland
Eupithecia vulgata lepsaria Staudinger, 1882 Kazakhstan
Eupithecia vulgata scotica Cockayne, 1951 Scotland

References

Chinery, Michael Collins Guide to the Insects of Britain and Western Europe 1986 (Reprinted 1991)
Skinner, Bernard Colour Identification Guide to Moths of the British Isles 1984

External links
 Lepiforum.de
 UKmoths

Eupithecia
Moths described in 1809
Moths of Africa
Moths of Asia
Moths of Europe
Taxa named by Adrian Hardy Haworth